Giuseppe Verduci (born 4 January 2002) is an Italian professional footballer who plays as a left-back for  club Siena.

Career

Early career 
Verduci joined Polisportiva Bruinese at the age of four. He moved to Torino at the age of six. At the age of 10, he moved to Juventus. In 2017, he won the under-15s championship.

Juventus U23 
Verduci made his debut for Juventus U23 – the reserve team of Juventus – on 7 March 2021 in a 1–0 away win against Grosseto. On 25 August 2021, Verduci was loaned to Grosseto. On 31 January 2022, Verduci's loan was interrupted. He only made 6 appearances with them. On 2 November, he scored his first professional goal in a Coppa Italia Serie C match against FeralpiSalò.

Siena 
On 23 January 2023, Verduci joined Serie C side Siena on a permanent deal, signing a long-term contract with the club.

Style of play 
Verduci is mainly a left-back, but can also play as a centre-back.

Career statistics

References

External links

Notelist 

2002 births
Living people
Sportspeople from Reggio Calabria
Footballers from Calabria
Italian footballers
Association football fullbacks
Torino F.C. players
Juventus F.C. players
Juventus Next Gen players
U.S. Grosseto 1912 players
A.C.N. Siena 1904 players
Serie C players